Ernest Ambrose Wilmot (1898–1988) was an Australian rugby league player who played in the 1920s.

Background
Wilmot was born at Waterloo, New South Wales in 1898.

Playing career
He came through the Souths junior league to play first grade with the South Sydney Rabbitohs for four seasons between 1921 and 1924. He played hooker in the 1924 Grand Final against Balmain, in which Souths lost 3–0.

Death
Wilmot died on 13 September 1988, aged 90.

References

South Sydney Rabbitohs players
Rugby league hookers
Australian rugby league players
1898 births
1988 deaths
Rugby league players from Sydney